Henning Helbrandt (30 May 1935 – 18 September 2010) was a Danish footballer who played as a midfielder or defender. He played in three matches for the Denmark national team in 1961. He was also part of Denmark's squad for the 1960 Summer Olympics, but he did not play in any matches.

References

External links
 

1935 births
2010 deaths
Footballers from Copenhagen
Danish men's footballers
Association football midfielders
Association football defenders
Denmark international footballers
Olympic footballers of Denmark
Footballers at the 1960 Summer Olympics
Kjøbenhavns Boldklub players